The 1989 Miami Hurricanes baseball team represented the University of Miami in the 1989 NCAA Division I baseball season. The Hurricanes played their home games at Mark Light Field. The team was coached by Ron Fraser in his 27th season at Miami.

The Hurricanes reached the College World Series, where they finished tied for fifth after winning one game and losing another against semifinalist  and losing to eventual runner-up Texas.

Personnel

Roster

Coaches

Schedule and results

References

Miami Hurricanes baseball seasons
Miami Hurricanes
College World Series seasons
Miami Hurricanes baseball